Hubert Beckers (4 November 1806 – 10 March 1889) was a German philosopher known chiefly as an expositor of the philosophy of Schelling.

Biography
He was born at Munich, and studied at the university there. In 1832 he was appointed professor of philosophy at the Lyceum at Dillingen, and in 1847 professor of philosophy at the University of Munich. In 1853 he became a member of the Bavarian Academy of Sciences.

Works
 Ueber das Wesen des Gefühles (1830) – On the essence of feeling.
 Cantica Spiritualia (Munich 1845–47).
 Denkrede auf Schelling (Munich 1855) – Commemorative address of Schelling.
 Ueber die Bedeutung der Schellingschen Metaphysik (Munich 1861) – On the significance of Schelling's metaphysics.
 Ueber die Wahre und Bleibende Bedeutung der Naturphilosophie Schelling's (1864) – On the true and lasting significance of Schelling's natural philosophy.
 Aphorismen über Tod und Unsterblichkeit (Munich 1889) – Aphorisms about death and immortality.

References

1806 births
1889 deaths
German philosophers
Ludwig Maximilian University of Munich alumni
Academic staff of the Ludwig Maximilian University of Munich
German male writers